Deborah Iurato is an Italian pop singer and TV personality, born on 21 November 1991 in Ragusa, Sicily. She first came to prominence as the winner of the thirteen season of the talent show Amici di Maria De Filippi in May 2014.

Biography and career 
Deborah Iurato made her debut in 2014 in the talent show Amici di Maria De Filippi, winning the thirteenth edition. In the same period she made her debut with her first EP, also titled Deborah Iurato, which reached the second position in the Italian album charts, as well as being certified platinum by Fimi for over 50,000 copies sold. Releases two singles "Danzeremo a luci spente" and "Anche se fuori è inverno", written by Fiorella Mannoia. The latter reached the first position of the Italian Singles Chart and received the gold certification. During 2014 summer she released the song "Piccole cose" and opens the concerts of Fiorella Mannoia and Alessandra Amoroso.

On 17 October 2014 the singer released the single "L'amore vero", which anticipated her debut album Libere. It peaked at 11 position on the Italian Album Charts, and it was promoted by the singles " Dimmi dov'è il cielo " and the homonyms "Libere", about women's rights.

On 5 June 2015 the singer published the single "Da sola", written by Giovanni Caccamo, from her upcoming second studio album. In February 2016 Iurato made her debut at the Sanremo Music Festival with Giovanni Caccamo with the single "Via da qui", achieving the third position in the final ranking. The single was included in the second studio album Sono ancora io, released on 12 February 2016, which reached FIMI's 31st position. At the end of July 2016 the collaboration "Lasciami andare" with rapper Moreno was revealed for the rapper's album, Slogan. From 16 September to 4 November she was a contestant in the sixth edition of the television program Tale e quale show, triumphing in the final episode. On 3 December she was a guest in the semi-final of the 59th edition of the Zecchino d'Oro.

Between 2016 and 2019 she was subject to a break from the release of new singles and albums, but she continued her various tours around Italy singing covers and songs from previous albums. In 2018 she was chosen to sing the Italian theme song of the television series Heidi, bienvenida a casa. On 27 May 2019, the 5th anniversary of the victory of Amici di Maria De Filippi, she announced her collaboration with Italian band Soul System in the new single "Stammi bene (on my mind)" released on 7 June, the first excerpt from her new studio album to be released in 2020. With the group also undertakes a tour during 2019.

On April 24, 2020, Iurato published a new single "Supereroi", written by herself.

Discography

Album

Single

Television programs 

 Amici di Maria De Filippi thirteen edition (Canale 5, 2014) contestant -winner
 66° Festival di Sanremo (Rai 1, 2016) – contestant
 Tale e quale show (Rai 1, 2016) – contestant – winner
 Zecchino d'Oro (Rai 1, 2016) – guest host
Una Voce Per San Marino (San Marino RTV, 2023) - contestant

References

External links 
 Profil on Amici

1991 births
Italian pop singers
People from Ragusa, Sicily
Living people
Italian singer-songwriters
21st-century Italian singers
21st-century Italian women singers
Musicians from the Province of Ragusa
Mass media people from Sicily